Mitsugi "Miki" Morita (sometimes credited as Mike Morita) was a Japanese character actor who worked in Hollywood from the 1920s through around 1940. He had worked as a stage actor before beginning his career onscreen.

Partial filmography

Souls for Sables (1925)
Broadway Lady (1925)
Telling the World (1928)
Shanghai Express (1932)
War Correspondent (1932)
They Call It Sin (1932)
Renegades of the West (1932)
Midnight Mary (1933)
Nagana (1933)
Christopher Strong (1933)
The Captain Hates the Sea (1934)
Behold My Wife! (1934)
Death Flies East (1935)
The Casino Murder Case (1935)
Oil for the Lamps of China (1935)
Grand Exit (1935)
The Dark Hour (1936)
The Walking Dead (1936)
Spendthrift (1936)
It Couldn't Have Happened – But It Did (1936)
Isle of Fury (1936)
North of Nome (1936)
Women of Glamour (1937)
Border Phantom (1937)
Wild West Days (1937)
It Happened in Hollywood (1937)
She Asked for It (1937)
The Awful Truth (1937)
Bulldog Drummond's Revenge (1937)
The House Across the Bay (1940)
Turnabout (1940)

References

External links

htt 
1896 births
1985 deaths 
Japanese male film actors 
Japanese male silent film actors 
Japanese emigrants to the United States 
American male film actors 
American male silent film actors 
20th-century American male actors 
Actors from Nagano Prefecture ps://www.discovernikkei.org/en/journal/2022/7/22/miki-morita/